The Virginia League was the name of an American professional minor league baseball league that operated between 1939 and 1942. This was the fourth of five incarnations of the Virginia League. The league was a Class D level league in 1939 and 1940. It became a Class C level league for the 1941 and 1942 seasons.  The Virginia League resumed play in 1948, after the conclusion of World War II.

History
After the Virginia League ceased operations following the 1928 season, the league returned to play in 1939 as a four-team Class D level league. The Harrisonburg Turks, Lynchburg Grays, the Salem-Roanoke Friends, and the Staunton Presidents began league play in 1939.  

In 1941, two new teams were added: the Newport News Pilots and the Petersburg Rebels.

In 1942, the Turks were replaced in the league by the Pulaski Counts.

The Virginia League returned to play in 1948, following the conclusion of World War II.

Virginia League 1939–1942 cities represented 

Harrisonburg, VA: Harrisonburg Turks 1939–1941 
Lynchburg, VA: Lynchburg Grays 1939; Lynchburg Senators 1940–1942 
Newport News, VA: Newport News Pilots 1941; Newport News Builders 1942
Petersburg, VA: Petersburg Rebels 1941–1942 
Pulaski, VA: Pulaski Counts 1942 
Salem, VA & Roanoke, VA: Salem-Roanoke Friends 1939–1942 
Staunton, VA: Staunton Presidents 1939–1942

Standings & statistics 

1939 Virginia League
 Playoff: Lynchburg 1 game, Staunton 0. Finals: Harrisonburg 3 games, Lynchburg 0. 

1940 Virginia League
 Playoff: Harrisonburg 2 games, Salem-Roanoke 1. Finals: Lynchburg 3 games, Harrisonburg 2. 

1941 Virginia League
 Playoffs: Lynchburg 3 games, Petersburg 0; Salem-Roanoke 3 games, Harrisburg 2. Finals: Salem-Roanoke 3 games, Lynchburg 2. 

1942 Virginia League
 Playoffs: Lynchburg 4 games, Newport News 2; Pulaski 4 games, Petersburg 2. Finals: Pulaski 4 games, Lynchburg 2.

References

Defunct minor baseball leagues in the United States
Baseball leagues in Virginia
Sports leagues established in 1939
Sports leagues disestablished in 1942